The Boys Doubles tournament of the 2013 BWF World Junior Championships was held from October 29 until November 3. Last year tournament won by Hong Kong pair Lee Chun Hei and Ng Ka Long.

In the all-Chinese final this year, Li Junhui and Liu Yuchen took the gold medal after beating their compatriots Huang Kaixiang and Zheng Siwei 14-21, 21-13, 22-20.

Seeded

  Li Junhui / Liu Yuchen (champion)
  Kevin Sanjaya Sukamuljo / Arya Maulana Aldiartama (quarter-final)
  Kim Jae-hwan / Kim Jung-ho (third round)
  Tao Jianqi / Zhao Jian (third round)
  Huang Kaixiang / Zheng Siwei (final)
  Johannes Pistorius / Marvin Seidel (first round)
  Dechapol Puavaranukroh / Kittinupong Ketlen (third round)
  Tien Tzu-chieh / Wang Chi-lin (semi-final)
  Chang Ko-chi / Liao Chi-hung (quarter-final)
  Chua Keh Yeap / Muhammad Amzzar Zainuddin (third round)
  Chua Khek Wei / Woon Mun Choon (second round)
  Darren Isaac Devadass / Ong Yew Sin (quarter-final)
  Andrey Dolotov / Alexandr Zinchenko (second round)
  Stefan Garev / Vladimir Shishkov (second round)
  Ruben Jille / Justin Teeuwen (second round)
  Lee Cheuk Yiu / Yeung Shing Choi (third round)

Draw

Finals

Top Half

Section 1

Section 2

Section 3

Section 4

Bottom Half

Section 5

Section 6

Section 7

Section 8

References
Main Draw (Archived 2013-10-29)

2013 BWF World Junior Championships
2013 in youth sport